The 1998 Carolina Panthers season was the franchise's 4th season in the National Football League and the 4th and final under head coach Dom Capers. They tried to improve upon their 7-9 record in 1997, and make it to the playoffs for the second time in franchise history, but failed and finished at a franchise worst 4–12 in 1998 and fourth of five teams in the NFC West until 2001. Dom Capers was fired at the end of the season and replaced by George Seifert.

Offseason

NFL Draft 

The 1998 NFL Draft took place at Radio City Music Hall in New York City on April 18 and April 19, 1998. The Panthers selected eight players in seven rounds.

Undrafted Free Agents

Personnel

Staff

Roster

Schedule 

Note: Intra-division opponents are in bold text.

Standings

References 

Carolina Panthers seasons
Carolina Panthers Season, 1998
Carolina